Orontobia coelestina is a moth of the family Erebidae. It was described by Rudolf Püngeler in 1904. It is found in the Chinese provinces of Xinjiang and Qinghai.

References

Spilosomina
Moths described in 1904